Chromobacterium is a genus of Gram-negative rod-shaped bacteria. Currently, eleven species within the genus are known, two of those are Chromobacterium violaceum and Chromobacterium subtsugae; the latter was discovered by scientists at the Agricultural Research Service in Beltsville, Maryland.

References 

Neisseriales
Bacteria genera